In music performance and education, the Berklee method is the music theory, terminology, and practice taught at Berklee College of Music, the largest independent college of contemporary music in the world. The "Berklee method" was founded by Lawrence Berk after study with Joseph Schillinger regarding the latter's "elaborate system of composition that employed mathematical permutation and combination process to generate rhythms, harmonies, and melodies". Later, attempting to codify jazz and popular music practice, the Berklee method often differs from common practice harmony and voice-leading rules or guidelines.

For example, Berklee Music Theory - Book 2 recommends the following accompaniment for a given lead sheet, while common practice theory would advise against or rule out the progression on the basis of all the chords being sevenths and thus dissonant.

The following remarks from Branford Marsalis may illustrate how Berklee also differs from traditional jazz: "Berklee has its own system of doing things, the Berklee way, the Berklee method. They basically say that when you write things that are theoretically against the Berklee method, then they're incorrect. Even if they sound great. Musically they sound great, but theoretically it's wrong, so it's wrong. Which is not the purpose of music. Music theories are just theories."

See also
Four note group
Kodály Method

Sources

Jazz music education